Stoiljković is a Serbian surname that may refer to:

Dušan Stoiljković (born 1994), Serbian football player 
Dušan Stoiljković (investor) (born 1969), Swedish entrepreneur and investor
Jovana Stoiljković (born 1988), Serbian handball player 

Serbian surnames
Slavic-language surnames
Patronymic surnames